Lokmanya: Ek Yugpurush is a 2015 Indian biographical film directed by Om Raut and produced by Neena Raut Entertainment. The film is based on the life story of Bal Gangadhar Tilak - a social reformer and the freedom fighter of the Indian independence movement. The film stars Subodh Bhave, Chinmay Mandlekar, Priya Bapat in pivotal roles. Subodh Bhave played the title role of Indian nationalist and social reformer Bal Gangadhar Tilak. The film is directorial debut of Om Raut and is produced by Neena Raut. The screenplay is written by Om Raut and Kaustubh Savarkar and the music is composed by duo Ajit-Sameer.

The film released on 2 January 2015 and received positive reviews from audience as well as critics.

Plot 
A biopic of legendary leader Baal Gangadhar Tilak respectfully addressed as Lokamanya, meaning Approved of People. A person, installed by people to their most admired leaders. Also called as "Father of Indian Unrest". The story begins with an ambitious boy making his way into bigger stage of nationalism. Tilak a man of strong will runs his newspapers as a mission, writes books, his speeches thrill and provoke the audiences against British Rulers. He suffers imprisonments and writes his own philosophy there. Every day brings him new challenges and he faces them, every situation looks like an opportunity for his Nation, his dream of powerful Indian State.

Cast

 Subodh Bhave as Bal Gangadhar Tilak
 Shweta Mahadik as Satyabhamabai (wife of lokmanya tilak)
 Chinmay Mandlekar as Makarand 
 Priya Bapat as Sameera 
 Angad Mhaskar as Daji Khare
 Sameer Vidwans as Gopal Ganesh Agarkar
 Prashant Uthale as Damodar Hari Chapekar
Bharat Dabholakar as British Police Officer Mr. Bruin
Dipesh Shah as Mahatma Gandhi
 Sahil Koparde as Dharap
 Nana Patekar as Narrator

Production
Makers almost spend 1.3 crore on visual effects.

Critical reception
The film was praised by audience as well as critics. A Reviewer of Divya Marathi wrote "A lot of footage is wasted trying to combine the current state. Nevertheless, it is good to experience this burning embers of popular thoughts on screen". A Reviewer of Loksatta wrote "Subodh Bhave has mastered the challenge of portraying the character of Lokmanya Tilak on screen. Chinmoy Mandlekar has played the difficult role of showing how confused Makarand is. The director has got the best support in the departments of costumes, music, background score, acting. Soumitra Pote of Maharashtra Times  wrote "In summary, showing such a Himalaya comes out if its surrounding shadows are as strong. However, today Om Raut has met the unimaginable challenge of making a film on popular Tilak in Marathi. It seems that he has worked honestly on this movie". Mihir Bhanage of The Times of India wrote " 'Lokmanya – Ek Yugpurush' raises many questions that get you thinking whether we have forgotten the sacrifices that got us freedom and more importantly, are we really free? Probably the power has changed but we are still being ruled and exploited".

Box Office
Lokmanya:Ek Yug Purush fared well over the first weekend collecting . The collections rose to  after 5 weeks making it one of the highest grossers in Subodh Bhave's career.

Awards and nominations 
 Official Selection in Indian Panorama Section at International Film Festival of India (2015)
 Official Selection at 17th London Asian Film Festival (2015)
 52nd Maharashtra State Awards 2015: Best Film

References

External links
 

2015 films
2010s Marathi-language films
Memorials to Bal Gangadhar Tilak
2015 directorial debut films
Films directed by Om Raut